Population and Environment is a quarterly peer-reviewed academic journal covering research on the reciprocal links between population, natural resources, and the natural environment. The journal was established in 1978 as the Journal of Population, obtaining its current title in 1980. The editor-in-chief is Elizabeth Fussell (Brown University); Vaida Thompson was the founding editor-in-chief (1977-1984). Former editors-in-chief of the journal include prominent racialists such as Virginia Abernethy  and Kevin B. MacDonald, but they appear to have lost control of the journal since MacDonald's term as editor ended in 2004. According to the Journal Citation Reports, the journal has a 2021 impact factor of 4.283.

Past editors
The following persons have been editor-in-chief:
2007-2017 Lori Hunter (University of Colorado Boulder)
2004-2007 Landis MacKellar (Vienna Institute of Demography)
1999-2004 Kevin MacDonald (California State University, Long Beach)
1988-1999 Virginia Abernethy (Vanderbilt University)
1984-1988 Burton Mindick (Cornell University) and Ralph Taylor (Johns Hopkins University)
1977-1984 Vaida D. Thompson (University of North Carolina, Chapel Hill)

References

External links 
 

Environmental social science journals
Springer Science+Business Media academic journals
Publications established in 1978
English-language journals
Quarterly journals
Demography journals